Woodlee is a surname. Notable people with the surname include:

Barbara W. Woodlee (born 1946), American college administrator
Zach Woodlee (born 1977), American choreographer and dancer